Georg Renatus Solta (18 April 1915 in Vienna – 2 May 2005) was an Austrian Indo-Europeanist who specialized in Balkan linguistics.

Works
1960, Die Stellung des Armenischen im Kreise der Indogermanischen Sprachen, Vienna
1965, Palatalisierung und Labialisierung, IF 70, 276–315.
1974, Zur Stellung der lateinischen Sprache, .
1980, Einführung in die Balkanlinguistik mit besonderer Berücksichtigung des Substrats und des Balkanlateinischen, .
1997, with G. Deeters and V. Inglisian, Armenisch Und Kaukasische Sprachen, .

See also
Balkanization
Paleo-Balkan languages
Norbert Jokl

References

Obituary and bibliography: Manfred Mayrhofer, Almanach der Österreichischen Akademie der Wissenschaften 155 (2005), 559-570.

External links
Solta's gallery at titus.uni-frankfurt.de

Linguists from Austria
Linguists of Indo-European languages
1915 births
2005 deaths
20th-century linguists